Alatau (Alataý)  is a metro station located in Almaty, Kazakhstan. The station opened on December 1, 2011, and is on Line 1 of the Almaty Metro rapid transit system.

References 

Almaty Metro stations
Railway stations opened in 2011
2011 establishments in Kazakhstan